Jeremy Ito (born March 4, 1986) is a former placekicker and punter for the Rutgers Scarlet Knights NCAA Division I-A football team. He was most recently a kicker for the Hamilton Tiger-Cats of the Canadian Football League. Ito is half Japanese. During his career at Rutgers, he was given the nickname "The Judge" - after Lance Ito, by fans for his clutch, game kicking performances.

High school
Ito attended Redlands High School in Redlands, California and was a student and a letterman in football, soccer, and golf. In football, he was a three-time All-Citrus Belt League selection.

College career
Ito had a career field goals made percentage of 72.1, connecting on 80 of 111 attempts for the Scarlet Knights.  A career highlight is a 28-yard game-winning field goal against the Louisville Cardinals in an upset victory on November 9, 2006, by a score of 28-25. The victory elevated Rutgers to # 7 in the country, their highest ranking ever. Ito was not drafted in the 2008 NFL Draft.

Professional career
In 2008, Ito was signed by the Saints, but was released at the beginning of the season.

On October 10, 2009, Ito was added to the practice roster of the Hamilton Tiger-Cats in the Canadian Football League. On November 8, 2009, he made his regular-season debut, kicking three field goals in Hamilton's victory over Winnipeg. On May 12, 2010, Ito was released by the Tiger-Cats.

References

External links
ESPN.com Player Card.

1986 births
American football in Japan
American football placekickers
American football punters
American players of Canadian football
American sportspeople of Japanese descent
Canadian football placekickers
Hamilton Tiger-Cats players
Living people
People from Loma Linda, California
Rutgers Scarlet Knights football players
Sportspeople from San Bernardino County, California
Players of American football from California